James Alan Ritchey (born July 10, 1973) is a former professional American football quarterback. He was signed by the Houston Oilers as an undrafted free agent in 1996 and was also a member of the Barcelona Dragons. Ritchey played college football at Stephen F. Austin (SFA), finishing his career ranked third in school history with 5,436 passing yards and 5,851 yards total offense.

References

1973 births
Living people
American football quarterbacks
Barcelona Dragons players
Houston Oilers players
People from Copperas Cove, Texas
Players of American football from Honolulu
Stephen F. Austin Lumberjacks football players
Tennessee Oilers players